"Tomboy" is the lead single from Panda Bear's fourth album of the same name. It was released as a 7" by Paw Tracks on July 13, 2010, and later released digitally on July 20. "Tomboy" is the first in a series of singles planned from Panda Bear on different labels, all leading up to the release of Tomboy.

The track "Slow Motion" has been well received by Pitchfork Media and has tagged as 'Best New Music'. The song is also at number #60 in Pitchfork Media's Top 100 Tracks of 2010.

"Slow Motion" was later used in the Season 9 episode of CSI: Miami "Blood Sugar" aired December 12, 2010.

Track listing

References

2010 singles
2010 songs